The "Go Home" vans were part of a controversial 2013 advertising campaign by the British Home Office in which advertising vans with slogans recommending that illegal immigrants should "go home or face arrest" were sent to tour areas with high immigrant populations. The hypothesis of the operation was that people who did not have leave to remain would voluntarily depart if "a near and present" danger, such as being arrested, was made apparent. The pilot programme, which had the internal codename 'Operation Vaken', ran in the six London boroughs of Barking and Dagenham, Barnet, Brent, Ealing, Hounslow, and Redbridge from 22 July to 22 August 2013, and was part of the Home Office hostile environment policy. In October 2013, the evaluation report stated that 60 voluntary departures were believed to be directly related to 'Operation Vaken' and 65 more cases were "currently being progressed to departure."

The posters on the vans depicted a person with a Home Office badge holding out a pair of handcuffs, under the message:

The campaign was cancelled after a public outcry against it.

An August 2013 Yougov poll found that 55% of British adults supported the scheme and 35% opposed it.

British politicians including Nick Clegg, Vince Cable and Eric Pickles expressed concerns about the campaign. Nigel Farage described the tone of the advertisements, which he saw as an attempt by the government to be seen to be "doing something" to appeal to UKIP voters, as "unpleasant". Yvette Cooper compared the slogans on the vans with slogans used by the National Front in the 1970s and the campaign was described by Diane Abbott as an example of dog-whistle politics, stating that "It is not so much dog-whistle politics as an entire brass band ... It is akin to scrawling 'Paki go home' on the side of buildings. I don't believe this policy is going to achieve anything besides stoking fear and resentment."

See also 
 Illegal immigration to the United Kingdom
 Racism in the UK Conservative Party

References 

2013 in British politics
Advertising campaigns
History of immigration to the United Kingdom
British political phrases